The Kankai River (also referred to as Kankai Mai or Mai Khola) is a trans-boundary river flowing through the hills of Ilam and the plains of the Jhapa District in Nepal. A holy river for many Hindus living nearby, the Kotihom river bank is a common site for death rituals. Kankai Irrigation Project, launched by the Nepalese government irrigates southern Jhapa, including Shivganj, Pachgachi and Mahavara.

the Kankai River has several tourist hotspots along its course, such as in the areas of Domukha, Dhanuskoti, Chuli, Chepti and Maipokhari. The river overflows during monsoons and has potential to overflow onto the thousands of hectares of fertile plains of Jhapa. The Kotihom Surunga Municipality holds an annual Mai Mela fair on March 1, where many people from Jhapa, Morang, Ilam and various parts of India come to enjoy and perform religious activities. Kankai Aryaghat, on the Kotihom bank of the river was built recently, funded by public investment. It is used for death rituals each day by the locals. The river is 702m long.

Etymology
This river name Kankai is taken from Sanskrit word ‘kanaka’, meaning "gold".  One common myth holds that, many years ago, a saint living in the hill region near the river found golden stones in the river, and hence gave it its name. ‘Kanakawati Mai’ , one of the river's alternate names means  ‘Goddess of gold’.

Course
The Kankai originates in the Mahabharat Range in Nepal. It flows through Nepal and then through the Indian state of Bihar to join the Mahananda in Kishanganj district.

The Kankai is a rainfed perennial river of eastern Nepal. The area has warm temperate rainy climates with mild winters. The upper part of the basin basically consists of granitic gneiss of Cambro-Ordovician age, and the lower part consists of Quaternary rocks. The Kankai is a gravelly river with more than 60% of its gravel being gneiss, the rest consisting of different metamorphic and sedimentary rocks. The sediment yield of the river is estimated to be 0.148 million ton/year.

Infrastructures

Irrigation system
The Kankai irrigation system was developed for the purpose of irrigating  of agricultural land in Jhapa, a Terai district located at the south-eastern corner of Nepal. Its command area is flanked by the Kankai in the east, the Khrisna River in the west, the Mahendra Highway in the north and the Indian border in the south. A detailed feasibility study of the project was completed in 1970 with the technical assistance of ADB. The construction was carried out in two phases. The first phase was initiated in 1973 and completed in 1981 with substantial delays and cost overruns. The second phase, to irrigate an additional 3 000 hectares, started in 1980 and was completed in 1991, bringing only  of land under irrigation. The total cost of the project was NRs 310 million, 63 percent of which came from an Asia Development Bank loan.

The diversion structure of the system is an ogee-type, concrete weir constructed at the debouching point of the Kankai.

The canal system consists of a three-tier network of canals. The first  reach of the main canal is lined with a design capacity of 10.15 m3/s; the other reaches are unlined and their capacity decreases from 7.25 to 1.75 m3/s.

The density of structures in the system is quite high. The canal network crosses many flashy rivers, hence many cross drain structures (siphons) have been built in the system. Steel gates have been built at all off-take points from the main canal and at all tertiary off-takes from secondary canals. The total number of such regulating structures is 322. Including all other subsidiary hydraulic structures, the structural density is as high as 0.2 per ha.

The command area consists of flat land (average slope of 1/800) with fertile soil. The soil texture varies from loamy to sandy loam. Alluvial soils exist in most parts of the command area. Brown forest soil is found in the northern part of the command while paddy soil exists in the southern parts.
  
After the completion of the second phase of the project, financial assistance from ADB ceased and in 1993 the Kankai Development Board, formed in 1973 for the implementation of the construction works, was dissolved. Since then, the Kankai irrigation office, under the Department of Irrigation, has been responsible for the operation and maintenance of the system.

Embankments
The Kankai, flowing through the central part of the Jhapa District, is one of the perennial rivers. Erosion of banks and inundation during rains cause problems for the residents of its catchment area near Satasidham and Panchganchi village development committees. The protection works being carried out with Government of India assistance of NRs.2.67 crores will help to control floods and protect valuable inhabited agricultural land of over 31,000 people along the banks of the catchment area. The project is being implemented by Department of Water Induced Disaster Prevention, Ministry of Water Resources, Government of Nepal with the participation of local users.

Kankai Multipurpose Project
The Kankai Multipurpose Project is proposed to be located in Jhapa and Ilam districts of Nepal. While the reservoir and its catchment lies in Ilam district, the irrigation command area is in Jhapa district. A net area of  will be irrigated. The project includes a 38-MW power plant. The project is part of the Kosi-Mechi link. The project has been stalled because of objections from India.

Culture
The Kankai River in Jhapa is a famous pilgrimage site. Devotees from various parts of the country and even from India throng the Kankai. People worship this river as Kankai Mai, the goddess of gold. The western bank of this river is known as Maidhar and the eastern one is known as Kotihom. Kankai Mela, one of the biggest mela in eastern region, is held here every Maghe Sankranti, the first day of the tenth month Magh of the Nepali calendar.

Gallery

References

External links
 Kankai River marked on OpenStreetMap, retrieved 26 December 2021.

Rivers of Koshi Province
Rivers of Bihar
International rivers of Asia